Aquilegia rockii is a species of flowering plant in the buttercup family with a native range comprising the WGSRPD floristic regions of South-Central China and Tibet, where it grows in forests. Plants grow 40-80cm tall, and produce flowers with purple or blue petals with spurs, which are either long or short. Longer spurs comprise a greater number of cells than shorter spurs; whether spurs are longer or shorter is determined through regulation of cell division rather than by plant growth substances.

The chloroplast genome of Aquilegia rockii has been fully sequenced: it has a total length of 162,123 base pairs, and contains 117 unique genes. Phylogenies based on chloroplast genome sequences place Aquilegia rockii in a clade with A. viridiflora and A. ecalcarata.

References 

rockii
Flora of South-Central China
Flora of Tibet